The first season of the TV Land original sitcom The Exes premiered on November 30, 2011 and ended February 1, 2012. A total of ten episodes were produced. The series stars Donald Faison, Wayne Knight, Kristen Johnston, David Alan Basche and Kelly Stables.

Season overview
The season begins with Holly moving her new client Stuart in with two of her divorced tenants Haskell and Phil. Over the course of the season Phil tries to set up Holly's assistant Eden, with a horse jockey to get him as a client, but he goes for Holly instead; Holly attempts to set up Stuart on his first date since his divorce, but it turns out his date is an escort; Haskell begins dating a woman over the internet and when she arrives for a visit Haskell gets Phil to pretend to be him; Phil goes to Stuart to get his tooth fixed and ends up sleeping with Stuart's long-time dental assistant.

Holly's mother visits her, and instead of telling her the truth about breaking up with her fiance, she moves back into the apartment she shared with her ex, while the boys stay at her place; Phil asks Stuart to be the translator for a Serbian lingerie model who can only speak her native language, but she ends up getting attracted to Stuart; Phil's ex-wife gets married so Phil no longer needs to pay her alimony; Holly begins dating basketball player Kevin Tyler, one of Phil's clients, which ends up affecting his basketball playing; and Holly asks one of the guys to be new boyfriend to make her ex-fiance jealous, but it doesn't go quite as planned.

Cast
 Donald Faison as Phil Chase
 Wayne Knight as Haskell Lutz
 David Alan Basche as Stuart Gardner
 Kelly Stables as Eden Konkler
 Kristen Johnston as Holly Franklin

Production
On March 21, 2011, the pilot was given a series order of ten episodes. The series premiered on November 30, 2011, and aired on Wednesday nights at 10:30 pm, following Hot in Cleveland. The series was created by Mark Reisman with the pilot directed by Andy Cadiff. The series is executive produced by Reisman, Franco Bario, Frank M. Garritano and Ben Raymond, alongside production companies Mark Reisman Productions and Acme Productions. Production on season one began in July 2011.

Guest stars for season one include, Judith Light as Marjorie, Holly's mother, Diedrich Bader as Paul, Holly's co-worker, Janina Gavankar as Carrie, Phil's ex-wife, Ken Marino as Brad, Holly's former cheating fiancé, Amar'e Stoudemire as Kevin Tyler, Phil's basketball player client who dates Holly, Kali Rocha as Deanna, Stuart's dental assistant, Victor Webster as Bob, a homeless man Holly becomes attracted to, Kim Poirier as Tracy, Ana Alexander as Tatiana, a Serbian lingerie model Phil dates, Paula Marshall as Katy, Stuart's date who turns out be an escort and Melanie Paxson as Rebecca, Haskell's internet girlfriend.

Episodes

References

External links
 

2011 American television seasons
2012 American television seasons